Ayşe Hande Ataizi (born 2 September 1973) is a Turkish actress.

Biography
Hande Ataizi began acting professionally at Yıldız Kenter's Kenter Theatre. She won the Golden Orange for Best Actress in 1996 for her performance in İrfan Tözüm's Mum Kokulu Kadınlar (Candle Scented Women). In 2012, she married the Bureau Chief for the news service Bloomberg Turkey. She played with Cem Davran in fantasy comedy series "Ruhsar" and period comedy movie "Kahpe Bizans"

Filmography

References

External links

1973 births
Living people
People from Bursa
Turkish film actresses
Turkish television actresses
Turkish stage actresses
20th-century Turkish actresses
Best Actress Golden Orange Award winners